Schor may refer to:

 Ilya Schor, (1904–1961), American painter, jeweler, engraver, sculptor, and artist of Judaica
 Johann Paul Schor (1615–1674), Austrian painter
 Juliet Schor (born 1955), American sociologist
 Lynda Schor (born 1950), American writer
 Mira Schor (born 1950), American artist
 Naomi Schor (1943–2001), American literary critic and theorist
 Nina F. Schor, American pediatric neurologist 
 Resia Schor, (1910–2006), Polish-born American artist

See also 
 Commodity Futures Trading Commission v. Schor, a U.S. Supreme Court case
 Shor (disambiguation)
 Schorr, a surname
 Shore (disambiguation)
 Schur, a surname

German-language surnames
Hebrew-language surnames
Jewish surnames